Beaver Creek Provincial Park is a provincial park on Lake Winnipeg near the mouth of Beaver Creek in the Northeast Northern Region census division in the Northern Region of Manitoba, Canada.

See also
List of protected areas of Manitoba

References

External links

Provincial parks of Manitoba
Protected areas established in 1997
1997 establishments in Manitoba
Protected areas of Manitoba